Yargeleh (also Romanized as Yārgeleh) is a village in Ab Barik Rural District, in the Central District of Sonqor County, Kermanshah Province, Iran. At the 2006 census, its population was 134, among 34 families.

References 

Populated places in Sonqor County